Municipal elections were held in Alberta, Canada on Monday, October 18, 2010. Since 1968, provincial legislation has required every municipality to hold triennial elections. Mayors (reeves), councillors (aldermen), and trustees were elected to office in 16 of the 17 cities, all 108 towns, all 95 villages, all 5 specialized municipalities, all 64 municipal districts, 3 of the 7 improvement districts, and the advisory councils of the 3 special areas. The City of Lloydminster is on the Saskatchewan schedule (every three years), and held elections on October 28, 2009 and October 24, 2012, while 4 improvement districts (Nos. 12, 13, 24, and 25) have no councils and are led solely by the Minister of Municipal Affairs. Since the 2007 municipal elections, the villages of Derwent, Kinuso, New Sarepta, and Thorhild were dissolved, the Municipality of Crowsnest Pass changed from town to specialized municipality status, and the Town of Lacombe became a city.

Cities 
Bold indicates elected, and incumbents are italicized.

Airdrie 

In the 2010 elections, the citizens of Airdrie elected one mayor and six aldermen (all at large), and participated in electing two of the Rocky View School Division's seven trustees (West Airdrie being Ward 7, & East Airdrie being part of Ward 3), and one of the Calgary Catholic School District's seven trustees (being part of Ward 3/5).

Brooks 

In the 2010 elections, the citizens of Brooks elected one mayor and six councillors (all at large), and participated in electing some of the Grasslands Regional Division No. 6's six trustees, and one of the Christ the Redeemer Catholic Separate Regional Division No. 3's eight trustees.

Calgary 

In the 2010 elections, the citizens of Calgary elected one mayor, 14 aldermen (one from each of 14 wards), the seven Calgary School District trustees (each representing 2 of 14 wards), and four of the seven Calgary Catholic School District trustees (each representing 2 of 14 wards).

Camrose 

In the 2010 elections, the citizens of Camrose elected one mayor, eight councillors (all at large), two of the Battle River Regional Division No. 31's eight trustees (as Ward Camrose), and one of the Elk Island Catholic Separate Regional Division No. 41's seven trustees (as Ward Camrose).

Cold Lake 

In the 2010 elections, the citizens of Cold Lake elected one mayor, six councillors (all at large), three of the Northern Lights School Division No. 69's nine trustees (as Ward 2), and three of the Lakeland Roman Catholic Separate School District No. 150's seven trustees (as Ward Cold Lake).

Edmonton 

In the 2010 elections, the citizens of Edmonton elected one mayor, 12 councillors (one from each of 12 wards), seven of the nine Edmonton Public Schools trustees (one from each of nine wards), and the seven Edmonton Catholic School District trustees (one from each of seven wards).

Fort Saskatchewan 

In the 2010 elections, the citizens of Fort Saskatchewan elected one mayor, six councillors (all at large), two of the Elk Island Public Schools Regional Division No. 14's nine trustees (as Ward Fort Saskatchewan), and one of the Elk Island Catholic Separate Regional Division No. 41's seven trustees (as Ward Fort Saskatchewan).

Grande Prairie 

In the 2010 elections, the citizens of Grande Prairie elected one mayor, eight aldermen (all at large), the five Grande Prairie School District No. 2357 trustees (at large), and five of the Grande Prairie Roman Catholic Separate School District No. 28's seven trustees (as Ward 1).

Lacombe 

In the 2010 elections, the citizens of Lacombe elected one mayor and six councillors (all at large), and participated in electing two of the Wolf Creek School Division No. 72's six trustees, and one of the St. Thomas Aquinas Roman Catholic Separate Regional Division No. 38's nine trustees.

Leduc 

In the 2010 elections, the citizens of Leduc elected six alderman (at large), two of the Black Gold Regional Schools' seven trustees (as Ward Leduc), and two of the St. Thomas Aquinas Roman Catholic Separate Regional Division No. 38's nine trustees (as from Ward Leduc). The incumbent mayor was unchallenged.

Lethbridge 

In the 2010 elections, the citizens of Lethbridge elected one mayor, eight alderman (all at large), none of the seven Lethbridge School District No. 51 trustees, and five of the Holy Spirit Roman Catholic Separate Regional Division No. 4's nine trustees (as Ward 2). However, one alderman-elect died before being sworn in, his vacancy was filled on February 1, 2011, by the 2010 runner-up.

Medicine Hat 

In the 2010 elections, the citizens of Medicine Hat elected one mayor, eight alderman (all at large), the five Medicine Hat School District No. 76 trustees (at large), and four of the Medicine Hat Catholic Separate Regional Division No. 20's five trustees (as Ward Medicine Hat).

Red Deer 

In the 2010 elections, the citizens of Red Deer elected one mayor, eight councillors (all at large), the seven Red Deer School District No. 104 trustees (at large), and five of the Red Deer Catholic Regional Division No. 39's seven trustees (as Red Deer Ward).

Spruce Grove 

In the 2010 elections, the citizens of Spruce Grove elected six alderman (at large), and two of the Parkland School Division No. 70's seven trustees (as Ward 5), and participated in electing three of the Evergreen Catholic Separate Regional Division No. 2's eight trustees (as Ward 2). The incumbent mayor was unchallenged.

St. Albert 

In the 2010 elections, the citizens of St. Albert elected one mayor, six councillors (all at large), four of the Greater St. Albert Catholic (Public) Schools' seven trustees (as Ward St. Albert), and the five St. Albert Protestant Separate School Division No. 6 trustees (at large).

Wetaskiwin 

In the 2010 elections, the citizens of Wetaskiwin elected one mayor, six aldermen (all at large), and three of the Wetaskiwin Regional Division No. 11's eight trustees (as Ward City), and participated in electing two of the St. Thomas Aquinas Roman Catholic Separate Regional Division No. 38's nine trustees (as Ward Wetaskiwin).

Towns 
The following are the election results for Alberta towns with a population over 7,500. Bold indicates elected, and incumbents are italicized.

Banff 

In the 2010 elections, the citizens of Banff elected six councillors (at large) and three of the Canadian Rockies Regional Division No. 12's seven trustees. A former councillor ran for mayor unchallenged.

Beaumont 

In the 2010 elections, the citizens of Beaumont elected one mayor, six councillors (all at large), and one of the Black Gold Regional Schools' seven trustees, and participated in electing one of the St. Thomas Aquinas Roman Catholic Separate Regional Division No. 38's nine trustees.

Canmore 

In the 2010 elections, the citizens of Canmore elected one mayor and six councillors (all at large), and participated in electing three of the Canadian Rockies Regional Division No. 12's seven trustees, and one of the Christ the Redeemer Catholic Separate Regional Division No. 3's eight trustees.

By-election

After Mayor Ron Casey left council, a by-election was scheduled for June 19, 2012, to fill the empty seat. Two incumbent Councillors also resigned, and ran for mayor.

Chestermere 

In the 2010 elections, the citizens of Chestermere elected six councillors (at large), and participated in electing one of the Rocky View School Division No. 41's seven trustees and one of the Calgary Catholic School District's seven trustees. The incumbent mayor was unchallenged.

Cochrane 

In the 2010 elections, the citizens of Cochrane elected one mayor, six councillors (all at large), and one of the Rocky View School Division's seven trustees, and participated in electing one of the Calgary Catholic School District's seven trustees.

Drumheller 

In the 2010 elections, the citizens of Drumheller elected one mayor, six councillors (all at large), and one of the Golden Hills School Division No. 75's six trustees, and participated in electing one of the Christ the Redeemer Catholic Separate Regional Division No. 3's eight trustees.

Edson 

In the 2010 elections, the citizens of Edson elected six councillors (all at large) and two of the Grande Yellowhead Public School Division No. 77's seven trustees, and participated in electing two of the Living Waters Catholic Regional Division No. 42's six trustees. The incumbent mayor was unchallenged.

High River 

In the 2010 elections, the citizens of High River elected one mayor, six councillors (all at large), and one of the Foothills School Division No. 38's five trustees, and participated in electing one of the Christ the Redeemer Catholic Separate Regional Division No. 3's eight trustees.

Hinton 

In the 2010 elections, the citizens of Hinton elected one mayor and six councillors (all at large), and two of the Grande Yellowhead Regional Division No. 35's seven trustees, and participated in electing one of the Evergreen Catholic Separate Regional Division No. 2's eight trustees.

By-election

After it was announced that Councillor Stephen Mitchell, and Mayor Glenn Taylor, would be leaving council, a by-election was scheduled for February 27, 2012, to fill the empty seats. Incumbent Councillor Ian Duncan also resigned, and ran for mayor unchallenged.

Innisfail 

In the 2010 elections, the citizens of Innisfail elected one mayor and six councillors (all at large), and participated in electing one of the Chinook's Edge School Division No. 73's nine trustees and one of the Red Deer Catholic Regional Division No. 39's seven trustees. With the past mayor retiring, the successful mayoral candidate defeated an incumbent councillor for the mayor's chair.

Morinville 

In the 2010 elections, the citizens of Morinville elected one mayor, six councillors (all at large), and two of the Greater St. Albert Catholic (Public) Schools' seven trustees.

By-election

After Councillor Ben Van DeWalle left council, a by-election was scheduled for August 23, 2012, to fill the empty seat.

Okotoks 

In the 2010 elections, the citizens of Okotoks elected one mayor, six councillors (all at large), and one of the Foothills School Division No. 38's five trustees, and participated in electing one of the Christ the Redeemer Catholic Separate Regional Division No. 3's eight trustees.

Stony Plain 

In the 2010 elections, the citizens of Stony Plain elected six councillors (at large), and participated in electing one of the Parkland School Division No. 70's seven trustees and two of the Evergreen Catholic Separate Regional Division No. 2's eight trustees. The incumbent mayor was unchallenged.

By-election

After it was announced that Mayor Ken Lemke, would be leaving council, a by-election was scheduled for May 1, 2012, to fill the empty seat. Incumbent Councillor William Choy also resigned, and ran for mayor successfully.

Strathmore 

In the 2010 elections, the citizens of Strathmore elected one mayor, six councillors (all at large), and participated in electing two of the Golden Hills School Division No. 75's six trustees and one of the Christ the Redeemer Catholic Separate Regional Division No. 3's eight trustees.

Sylvan Lake 

In the 2010 elections, the citizens of Sylvan Lake elected one mayor and six councillors (all at large), and participated in electing one of the Chinook's Edge School Division No. 73's nine trustees.

Taber 

In the 2010 elections, the citizens of Taber elected six councillors (all at large), and participated in electing three of the Horizon School Division No. 67's seven trustees and one of the Holy Spirit Roman Catholic Separate Regional Division No. 4's nine trustees. The incumbent mayor was unchallenged.

Whitecourt 

In the 2010 elections, the citizens of Whitecourt participated in electing two of the Northern Gateway Regional Division No. 10's nine trustees, and two of the Living Waters Catholic Regional Division No. 42's six trustees. The citizens however did not elect a mayor and councillors as the lone mayoral candidate (the incumbent) and the six councillor candidates (five being incumbents) formed Whitecourt's 2010–2013 council by acclamation. A second mayoral candidate, who was the runner-up in the 2007 municipal election, withdrew from the race a day after nomination day, negating the requirement for the election.

Specialized municipalities 
The following are the election results for Alberta specialized municipalities with a population over 7,500, two of which include the urban service areas of Fort McMurray and Sherwood Park. Bold indicates elected, and incumbents are italicized.

Mackenzie County 

In the 2010 elections, the citizens of Mackenzie County elected six of their ten councillors (one from each of ten wards), and the eight Fort Vermilion School Division No. 52's trustees. Four of the council candidates, three being incumbents, were unchallenged. Council appointed Ward 2 Councillor Bill Neufeld the County Reeve.

Strathcona County 

In the 2010 elections, the citizens of Strathcona County elected one mayor, five of the eight councillors (one from each of eight wards), four of the Elk Island Public Schools Regional Division No. 14's nine trustees (3 from Sherwood Park, and 1 from Strathcona County north), and four of the Elk Island Catholic Separate Regional Division No. 41's seven trustees (supporters in Sherwood Park). After Ward 5 Councillor Jacquie Fenske left council, a by-election was scheduled for June 25, 2012, to fill the empty seat.

Wood Buffalo 

In the 2010 elections, the citizens of the Regional Municipality of Wood Buffalo elected one mayor, eight of their ten councillors (from four wards), the five Fort McMurray Public School District trustees (in Fort McMurray), three of the Northland School Division No. 61's 23 school boards (outside Fort McMurray, three or five trustees each), and the five Fort McMurray Roman Catholic Separate School District No. 32 trustees (in Fort McMurray). After two Ward 1 Councillors left council, a by-election was scheduled for June 25, 2012, to fill the empty seats.

Municipal districts 
The following are the election results for Alberta municipal districts (counties) with a population over 7,500. Bold indicates elected, and incumbents are italicized.

Athabasca County 

In the 2010 elections, the citizens of Athabasca County elected eight of the nine councillors (one from each of nine divisions) and five of the Aspen View Regional Division No. 19's nine trustees. One incumbent councillor was unchallenged. Council appointed the Division 7 Councillor David Yurdiga the County Reeve.

M.D. of Bonnyville 

In the 2010 elections, the citizens of the Municipal District of Bonnyville No. 87 elected three of the six councillors (one from each of six wards), and three of the Northern Lights School Division No. 69's nine trustees (as Ward 1), and participated in electing three of the Lakeland Roman Catholic Separate School District No. 150's seven trustees (supporters near Bonnyville). The incumbent reeve and three of the incumbent councillors were unchallenged.

Camrose County 

In the 2010 elections, the citizens of Camrose County elected three of the seven councillors (one from each of seven divisions) and two of the Battle River Regional Division No. 31's eight trustees (as Ward Camrose County), and participated in electing one of the Elk Island Catholic Separate Regional Division No. 41's seven trustees (supporters near Camrose). Four of the council candidates, three being incumbents, were unchallenged. Council appointed the Division 3 Councillor Don Gregorwich the County Reeve.

Clearwater County 

In the 2010 elections, the citizens of Clearwater County elected five of the seven councillors (one from each of seven divisions) and two of the Wild Rose School Division No. 66's six trustees (one from each of Wards 3 & 4). Two of the council candidates, one being an incumbent, were unchallenged. Council appointed the Division 7 Councillor Pat Alexander the County Reeve.

M.D. of Foothills 

In the 2010 elections, the citizens of the Municipal District of Foothills No. 31 elected two of the seven councillors (one from each of seven divisions) and three of the Foothills School Division No. 38's five trustees (one from each of Wards 1, 2, & 3), and participated in electing two of the Christ the Redeemer Catholic Separate Regional Division No. 3's eight trustees (supporters near High River & Okotoks). Four of the incumbent councillors were unchallenged. Council appointed the Division 6 Councillor Larry Spilak the District Reeve.

County of Grande Prairie 

In the 2010 elections, the citizens of the County of Grande Prairie No. 1 elected three of the nine councillors (one from each of nine divisions) and five of the Peace Wapiti School Division No. 76's nine trustees (one from each of Wards 3, 4, 5, 6, & 7), and participated in electing six of the Grande Prairie Roman Catholic Separate School District No. 28's seven trustees (supporters near Beaverlodge, Grande Prairie, & Sexsmith). Six of the council candidates, five being incumbents, were unchallenged. Council appointed the Division 1 Councillor Everett McDonald the County Reeve.

By-election

After Division 1 Councillor, and Reeve, Everett McDonald left council, a by-election was scheduled for June 11, 2012, to fill the empty seat. Council appointed the Division 3 Councillor Leanne Beaupre the County Reeve.

Lac La Biche County 

In the 2010 elections, the citizens of Lac La Biche County elected one mayor, eight councillors (one from each of Wards 1–6, & two from Ward 7), and three of the Northern Lights School Division No. 69's nine trustees (one from each of Wards 3, 4, & 5).

By-election

After it was announced that Mayor Peter Kirylchuck, would be leaving council, a by-election was scheduled for September 5, 2012, to fill the empty seat. Incumbent Councillor Aurel Langevin also resigned, and ran for mayor successfully.

Lac Ste. Anne County 

In the 2010 elections, the citizens of Lac Ste. Anne County elected the County Council, which consists of seven councillors (one from each of seven divisions), and three of the Northern Gateway Regional Division No. 10's nine trustees (one from each of Wards Mayerthorpe, Onoway, & Sangudo). Council appointed the Division 7 Councillor Lloyd Giebelhaus the County Reeve.

Lacombe County 

In the 2010 elections, the citizens of Lacombe County elected six of the seven councillors (one from each of seven divisions) and three of the Wolf Creek School Division No. 72's six trustees (from Wards 4 & 5), and participated in electing one Wolf Creek trustee from Ward 1, and one of the St. Thomas Aquinas Roman Catholic Separate Regional Division No. 38's nine trustees (supporters near Lacombe). After winning a tie breaker draw the previous election, the Division 6 incumbent was unchallenged. Council appointed the Division 5 Councillor Ken Wigmore the County Reeve.

By-election
After Division 3 Councillor Doug Sproule died, a by-election was held on June 6, 2011, to fill the empty seat, Cliff Soper, who placed a close second in 2010, won.

Leduc County 

In the 2010 elections, the citizens of Leduc County elected five of the seven councillors (one from each of seven divisions) and three of the Black Gold Regional Schools' seven trustees (one from each of Wards County West, Central, & East), and participated in electing three of the St. Thomas Aquinas Roman Catholic Separate Regional Division No. 38's nine trustees (supporters near Beaumont & Leduc) and one of the Evergreen Catholic Separate Regional Division No. 2's eight trustees (supporters near Devon). Two of the incumbent councillors were unchallenged. Council appointed the Division 4 Councillor John Whaley the Mayor.

County of Lethbridge 

In the 2010 elections, the citizens of the County of Lethbridge elected three of the seven councillors (one from each of seven divisions) and five of the Palliser Regional Division No. 26's six trustees (one from each of five divisions), and participated in electing seven of the Holy Spirit Roman Catholic Separate Regional Division No. 4's nine trustees (supporters near Coaldale, Lethbridge, & Picture Butte). Four of the incumbent councillors were unchallenged, in divisions 2 and 3 this was the second time in a row. Council appointed the Division 1 Councillor Lorne Hickey the County Reeve.

Mountain View County 

In the 2010 elections, the citizens of Mountain View County elected seven councillors (one from each of seven divisions) and four of the Chinook's Edge School Division No. 73's nine trustees (one from each of Wards 6, 7, 8, & 9). Council appointed the Division 6 Councillor Paddy Munro the County Reeve.

Parkland County 

In the 2010 elections, the citizens of Parkland County elected one mayor, four of the six councillors (one from each of six divisions), and four of the Parkland School Division No. 70's six trustees (one from each of Wards 1, 2, 4, & 6), and participated in electing five of the Evergreen Catholic Separate Regional Division No. 2's eight trustees (supporters near Spruce Grove & Stony Plain). Two of the incumbent councillors were unchallenged.

Ponoka County 

In the 2010 elections, the citizens of Ponoka County elected the County Council, which consists of five councillors (one from each of five divisions), and participated in electing two of the Wolf Creek School Division No. 72's six trustees (from Wards 2 & 3) and one of the St. Thomas Aquinas Roman Catholic Separate Regional Division No. 38's nine trustees (supporters near Ponoka). Council appointed the Division 1 Councillor Gordon Svenningsen the County Reeve for one year.

Red Deer County 

In the 2010 elections, the citizens of Red Deer County elected one mayor, six councillors (one from each of six divisions), and five of the Chinook's Edge School Division's nine trustees (one from each of Wards 1, 2, 3, 4, & 5).

Rocky View County 

In the 2010 elections, the citizens of Rocky View County elected eight of the nine councillors (one from each of nine divisions) and five of the Rocky View School Division's seven trustees (one from each of Wards 1, 2, 4, 5, & 6), and participated in electing three of the Calgary Catholic School District's seven trustees (supporters near Airdrie, Chestermere, & Cochrane). For the second time in a row, the incumbent Division 7 councillor was unchallenged. Council appointed the Division 4 Councillor Ronald Ashdown the County Reeve.

By-election

Division 1 Councillor Rick Butler died in December 2011, a by-election was scheduled for March 26, 2012, to fill the empty seat.

Sturgeon County 

In the 2010 elections, the citizens of Sturgeon County elected three of the six councillors (one from each of six divisions), and the seven Sturgeon School Division No. 24 trustees (one from each of seven wards). The incumbent mayor, and three incumbent councillors were unchallenged.

County of Vermilion River 

In the 2010 elections, the citizens of the County of Vermilion River elected four of the seven councillors (one from each of seven divisions) and four of the Buffalo Trail Public Schools Regional Division No. 28's nine trustees (one from each of four divisions), and participated in electing two of the East Central Alberta Catholic Separate Schools Regional Division No. 16's eight trustees (supporters near Vermilion). Residents who live near Lloydminster, and send their children to city schools, cannot vote for their trustees, because of Lloydminster being on the Saskatchewan election schedule, and the Lloydminster Public School and Roman Catholic Separate School Divisions using the Saskatchewan curriculum. Three of the incumbent councillors were unchallenged. Council appointed the Division 3 Councillor Richard Van Ee the County Reeve.

County of Wetaskiwin 

In the 2010 elections, the citizens of the County of Wetaskiwin No. 10 elected five of the seven councillors (one from each of seven divisions), and four of the Wetaskiwin Regional Division No. 11's eight trustees (one from each of Wards 1, 2, 3, & 4), and participated in electing two of the St. Thomas Aquinas Roman Catholic Separate Regional Division No. 38's nine trustees (supporters near Wetaskiwin). For the second time in a row, the incumbent Division 3 and 4 councillors were unchallenged. Council appointed the Division 3 Councillor Garry Dearing the County Reeve.

Wheatland County 

In the 2010 elections, the citizens of Wheatland County elected three of the seven councillors (one from each of seven divisions) and three of the Golden Hills School Division No. 75's six trustees (two from Ward 4, & one from Ward 5), and participated in electing two of the Christ the Redeemer Catholic Separate Regional Division No. 3's eight trustees (supporters near Drumheller, Rosebud, & Strathmore). Four of the incumbent councillors were unchallenged. Council appointed the Division 7 Councillor Ben Armstrong the District Reeve for one year.

Yellowhead County 

In the 2010 elections, the citizens of Yellowhead County elected six of the eight councillors (one from each of eight divisions), and five of the Grande Yellowhead Public School Division No. 77's seven trustees, and participated in electing one of the Evergreen Catholic Separate Regional Division No. 2's eight trustees (supporters near Hinton) and two of the Living Waters Catholic Regional Division No. 42's six trustees (supporters near Edson). The incumbent mayor and two of the council candidates, one being an incumbent, were unchallenged.

By-election

After it was announced that Division 4 Councillor Brandon DePee, would be leaving council, a by-election was scheduled for February 27, 2012, to fill the empty seat.

See also 
Canadian electoral calendar, 2010
Municipal elections in Canada

References